Jamie Marion Linden (born July 19, 1972) is a Canadian former professional ice hockey right winger. He played 4 games for the Florida Panthers in the 1994–95 season, collecting 17 penalty minutes. The rest of his career, which lasted from 1993 to 1998, was spent in the minor leagues.

His brother is former NHLer Trevor Linden. Linden and his brother own Linden Construction, a construction firm in Vancouver, British Columbia.

Career statistics

Regular season and playoffs

References

External links
 

1972 births
Living people
Birmingham Bulls (ECHL) players
Canadian ice hockey right wingers
Canadian people of Dutch descent
Carolina Monarchs players
Cincinnati Cyclones (IHL) players
Florida Panthers players
Grand Rapids Griffins (IHL) players
Ice hockey people from Alberta
Las Vegas Thunder players
Medicine Hat Tigers players
Portland Winterhawks players
Prince Albert Raiders players
Spokane Chiefs players
Sportspeople from Medicine Hat
Undrafted National Hockey League players